The Zarra Trophy is a trophy awarded annually by the Spanish sports daily Marca to the Spanish domestic player with the highest goal total in La Liga. It is named after the former Athletic Bilbao striker Telmo Zarra.

It was awarded for the first time in 2006 to David Villa of Valencia.

Winners

La Liga

Players in bold won the Pichichi Trophy in the same season.

* Diego Costa was naturalized as a Spanish citizen.

Segunda División

Players in bold finished as top scorer in the same season.

Before the Trophy

La Liga

Players in bold won the Pichichi Trophy in the same season.

* Player was naturalized.

Notes

See also
Don Balón Award
Pichichi Trophy
Zamora Trophy
Trofeo Alfredo Di Stéfano
Miguel Muñoz Trophy

La Liga trophies and awards
Spanish football trophies and awards
Spain Zarra
Association football player non-biographical articles